The 2nd Kazakhstan President Cup was played from April 26 to April 30, 2009 in Almaty. 8 youth teams participated in the tournament (players were born no earlier than 1993.)

Participants

Venues 
The match of opening and the final took place at the Central Stadium. Other matches took place at Football Land.

Format 
The tournament is held in two stages. At the first stage, eight teams are divided into two qualification groups (A and B). Competitions of the first stage were held on circular system. The winners of the groups advance to the final, while the group runners-up meet to determine third place.

Group stage 
All times UTC+6

Group A

Group B

Match for the 7th place

Match for the 5th place

Bronze medal match

Final

Statistics

Awards 
 The best player of a tournament
 Andre Fernandez (Ole Brasil)
 Goalscorer of a tournament
 Aleksandr Kozlov (Spartak;14 goals)
 The best goalkeeper of a tournament
 Sergei Panchin (Rubin)
 The best defender of a tournament
 Jordi Pronk (ADO Den Haag)
 The best midfielder of a tournament
 Serder Serderov (CSKA)
 The best forward of a tournament
 Aleksandr Kozlov (Spartak)

Prize money 
According to FFK, the prize fund of a tournament will make 20,000 $. "The teams which took 1, 2 and 3 place will be received, respectively 10,000, 6,000 and 4,000 $.

2009
2009 in Kazakhstani football
2008–09 in European football
2009 in Asian football
2009 in youth association football